Lindsay Davenport and Lisa Raymond were the defending champions but only Raymond competed that year with Martina Navratilova.

Navratilova and Raymond lost in the quarterfinals to Alicia Molik and Magüi Serna.

Molik and Serna won in the final 6–4, 6–4 against Svetlana Kuznetsova and Elena Likhovtseva.

Seeds
Text in italics indicates the round in which those seeds were eliminated.

 Svetlana Kuznetsova /  Elena Likhovtseva (final)
 Martina Navratilova /  Lisa Raymond (quarterfinals)
 Liezel Huber /  Ai Sugiyama (quarterfinals)
 Cara Black /  Rennae Stubbs (quarterfinals)

Draw

External links
2004 Hastings Direct International Championships Doubles draw

Doubles
Hastings Direct International Championships